Harmlos is  located in Maxvorstadt, Munich, Bavaria, Germany. 

Buildings and structures in Munich
Maxvorstadt